The headlight fish (Diaphus effulgens) is a species of lanternfish in the family Myctophidae. It is also sometimes referred to as the headlight lanternfish, or even the lanternfish, though it is not the only species to be called this.

Description
This species can be distinguished from other deepwater fishes such as the lanternfish Myctophum affine and from Pearlsides (in the genus Maurolicus) by the large luminescent patch (from which the headlight fish gets its name) that covers the front of its head, between the nares.

Taxonomy and naming
The headlight fish was first described by American ichthyologists George Brown Goode and Tarleton Hoffman Bean in 1896. It was originally placed in the genus Aethoprora, which has since been synonymized into the headlight fish's current genus Diaphus.

The generic name, Diaphus, is a combination of the Greek words Dia (Δία), meaning "through", and Physa (Φυσα), "bellows". The species name, effulgens, is a Latin word meaning glittering or flashing.

Distribution and habitat
The range of the headlight fish covers the Atlantic, Pacific, and Indian Oceans. In the eastern Atlantic, they are known from the Antarctic Convergence  zone in the south to the English Channel in the north. In the western Atlantic, they can be found from the east coast of the United States south to the southern border of Brazil. In the Indian Ocean they are generally found from about 70°E to between 5°S and 38°S. In the Pacific, they are known from 0° to 29°N, and are also seen in waters near Southeast Asia, Australia, and New Zealand.

The species is both high-oceanic and mesopelagic. There is some size stratification with depth, and the female fish are believed to spawn in deep water.

References

Myctophidae
Fish of the East Atlantic
Fish of the Western Atlantic
Fish of the Indian Ocean
Fish of the Pacific Ocean
Fish described in 1896
Taxa named by Tarleton Hoffman Bean
Taxa named by George Brown Goode